Nu Geminorum, Latinized from ν Geminorum, is a triple star system in the constellation Gemini. It has an apparent visual magnitude of 4.16, which is bright enough to be visible to the naked eye on a dark night. Based upon an annual parallax shift of 5.99 mas, it is located at a distance of roughly 540 light years from the Sun. The position of this system near the ecliptic means it is subject to lunar occultations.

The inner components of this multiple star system have an orbital period of about 54 days and a nearly circular orbit with an eccentricity of 0.056. There is some uncertainty in the spectral type, with classifications ranging from a main sequence star to a giant. Orbiting the inner pair is a classical Be star, with an orbital period of 19.1 years and an eccentricity of 0.24. The two orbits are co-directional and roughly coplanar. The system is overall dynamically stable, and shows no signs of Kozai-Lidov cycles. The outer Be star appears to be single.

According to the catalogue of stars in the Technical Memorandum 33-507 - A Reduced Star Catalog Containing 537 Named Stars, this star was titled as Nucatai.

References

External links

B-type giants
Shell stars
Gemini (constellation)
Geminorum, Nu
Durchmusterung objects
Geminorum, 18
045542
030883
02343
Triple star systems